Limnaea or Limnaia may refer to:
Limnaea (Acarnania), a town of ancient Acarnania, Greece
Limnaea (Thessaly), a town of ancient Thessaly, Greece
 Limnaea, a genus of snails in the family Lymnaeidae, synonym of Lymnaea
 Limnaea, a genus of bivalves in the family Unionidae, synonym of Unio

See also
Limnae (disambiguation)